The award for Peoples Choice: Favorite Canadian Artist is presented at the MuchMusic Video Awards. It is presented to a Canadian solo artist. So far, Avril Lavigne holds the record for most awards in this category with four. Sarah McLachlan and Nelly Furtado are behind her with two awards respectively.

Winners

MuchMusic Video Awards